Abhinav Singh Kashyap (born 6 September 1974) is an Indian film director and screenwriter, who initially gained recognition for directing and co-writing Dabangg (2010).

Early life and education 
Kashyap was born in Obra, Uttar Pradesh where his father worked for the Uttar Pradesh Power Corporation.

He is an alumnus of The Scindia School, Gwalior and completed his graduation in English Hons from Hansraj College, University of Delhi in 1995.

He is the younger brother of director Anurag Kashyap and Anubhuti Kashyap.

Career 
In 2000, he was involved in writing the script of the film Jung. He worked as an assistant to film maker Mani Ratnam for the film Yuva (2004). He also wrote dialogue for the films Manorama Six Feet Under (2007) and 13B (2009). He made his debut as a director in the 2010 action film Dabangg, which he also co-wrote, along with Dilip Shukla. Bollywood actor Salman Khan and debutant actress Sonakshi Sinha played the lead roles in the film. Dabangg was released on 10 September 2010. His second film Besharam was released on 2 October 2013. It was a critical and commercial failure. He also worked as a boom operator in 2012 short film named The Photograph.

Accusations against Khan family
On 15 June 2020, Kashyap released a statement on Facebook on the suicide of actor Sushant Singh Rajput, appealing the Maharashtra government to launch a detailed investigation. He accused Salman Khan, his brothers Arbaaz and Sohail and father Salim of sabotaging his career and bullying him. In response, Arbaaz said that the Khan family has started legal action against Kashyap.

When Salim was asked to react to these claims, and he sarcastically said that of course they have ruined his career. Salim said watch his films first and then come to speak to him. Salim further said that Abhinav probably forgot to take his father, Rashid Khan’s name along with his forefathers. Salim concluded by saying that Abhinav can do whatever he wants and that he’s not going to waste time reacting to these accusations.

Personal life 
Kashyap was married to Chatura Rao from 1997 to 2017, they have two daughters.

In 2015, Kashyap was involved with actress Simran Suri.

Filmography

Films

Television

References

External links 
 
 
 

Living people
Hindi-language film directors
Indian male screenwriters
Delhi University alumni
Indian television writers
People from Sonbhadra district
Scindia School alumni
21st-century Indian film directors
Film directors from Uttar Pradesh
Directors who won the Best Popular Film Providing Wholesome Entertainment National Film Award
Male television writers
1974 births